Proteodes profunda is a species of moth in the family Depressariidae. It is endemic to New Zealand. This species has been collected in its type locality of Mount Holdsworth in the Tararua Range, Raurimu near Tongariru National Park, at Days Bay in Wellington, at Mount Arthur, Otira, Invercargill, and in Southland. P. profunda lives in beech forests at altitudes of around 2000 ft and larvae feed on beech tree leaves. Adults of this species are on the wing from November to February.

Taxonomy 
This species was described by Edward Meyrick in 1905 using a male specimen collected by George Hudson at Mount Holdsworth in Wellington at 2000 ft. The holotype specimen is held at the Natural History Museum, London.

Description 
 
Meyrick described the species as follows:

This species is superficially very similar in appearance to species in the Tortricidae family and mimics a dead beech leaf. Hudson regarded it as rare.

Distribution
This species is endemic to New Zealand and has been collected in its type locality of Mount Holdsworth in the Tararua Range, Raurimu near Tongariru National Park, Days Bay in Wellington, Mount Arthur, Otira, Invercargill, and in Southland.

Habitat and hosts

P. profunda lives in beech forests at altitudes of around 2000 ft. Larvae of this species feed on beech tree leaves.

Behaviour
Adults of this species are on the wing from November to February.

References

Moths described in 1905
Moths of New Zealand
Depressariidae
Endemic fauna of New Zealand
Taxa named by Edward Meyrick
Endemic moths of New Zealand